İsalar is a village in the municipality of Əfətli in the Agdam Rayon of Azerbaijan.

References

Populated places in Aghdam District